The men's basketball tournament at the 2000 Summer Olympics in Sydney, began on 17 September and ended on 1 October, when the United States defeated France 85–75 for the gold medal. Preliminary round games were held at The Dome and elimination games at the Sydney SuperDome.

Qualification

Format
 Twelve teams are split into 2 preliminary round groups of 6 teams each. The top 4 teams from each group qualify for the knockout stage.
 Fifth and sixth-placed teams from each group are ranked 9th–12th in two additional matches.
 In the quarterfinals, the matchups are as follows: A1 vs. B4, A2 vs. B3, A3 vs. B2 and A4 vs. B1.
The eliminated teams at the quarterfinals are ranked 5th–8th in two additional matches.
 The winning teams from the quarterfinals meet in the semifinals as follows: A3/B2 vs. A1/B4 and A2/B3 vs. A4/B1.
 The winning teams from the semifinals dispute the gold medal. The losing teams dispute the bronze.

Ties are broken via the following the criteria, with the first option used first, all the way down to the last option:
 Head to head results
 Goal average (not the goal difference) between the tied teams
 Goal average of the tied teams for all teams in its group

Squads

Preliminary round
All times are local (UTC+11)

Group A

Group B

Tournament bracket

Quarterfinals

Semifinals

Finals

Classification round

Awards

Statistical leaders
Top ten in points, rebounds and assists, and top 5 in steals and blocks.

Points

Rebounds

Assists

Steals

Blocks

Game highs

Final standings

See also
 Women's Tournament

References

2000 Olympic Games: Tournament for Men, FIBA Archive. Accessed June 10, 2011.
 Official Olympic Report la84foundation.org. Accessed June 10, 2011.

External links
Basketball at the 2000 Summer Olympics – Men's basketball at Sports Reference

 
Men
Basketball at the Summer Olympics – Men's tournament